Sine Screen (stylized as Cine Screen) is an independent film division of ABS-CBN Films.

Filmography
 2011
 The Adventures of Pureza: Queen of the Riles (July 13) - starring: Melai Cantiveros, Jason Francisco, Joem Bascon, Martin del Rosario and Bianca Manalo; distributed by Star Cinema
 2012
 Anino (Not Released) - with Star Magic Workshops
 2015
 El Brujo
 2018
 Tres (October 3) - starring: Jolo Revilla, Bryan Revilla and Luigi Revilla; co-produced by Imus Productions
 2019
Familia Blondina (February 27) - starring: Karla Estrada, Jobert Austria, Kira Balinger, Marco Gallo, Xia Vigor, Chantal Videla, Shane Weinberg, Awra Briguela, Heaven Peralejo, Negi; co-produced by Arctic Sky Entertainment
Man & Wife (May 8) - starring: Gabby Concepcion, Jodi Sta. Maria: co-produced by Cineko Productions

External links
 

Philippine film studios
Film production companies of the Philippines
Entertainment companies established in 2011
Star Cinema